The Liberal Left (Sinistra Liberale, SL) was a minor liberal faction within the Democrats of the Left, an Italian political party.

It was formed basically by former left-wingers of the Italian Liberal Party. Its leaders include Gianfranco Passalacqua, Paolo Colla and Antonio Saitta.

In January 2008 Liberal Left members took part in the foundation of the Liberal PD, a joint faction of all the liberals and social-liberals within the Democratic Party.

External links
Official website

Democratic Party (Italy) factions
Liberalism in Italy